Alexander Ogle (August 10, 1766 – October 14, 1832) was an American politician who served as a Jackson Democrat member of the U.S. House of Representatives for Pennsylvania's 8th congressional district from 1817 to 1819.

Early life
Ogle was born August 10, 1766 in Frederick, Maryland.  In 1795, he moved to Somerset, Pennsylvania.  He is the father of Charles Ogle and grandfather of Andrew Jackson Ogle

Career
He served as a member of the Pennsylvania House of Representatives in 1803, 1804, 1807, 1808, and 1811.  During the war of 1812, he served as major general in the Pennsylvania militia, commanding the 12th division, comprising recruits from Somerset, Bedford and Cambria counties.  He worked as prothonotary, recorder of deeds, and clerk of courts from 1812 to 1817. He owned slaves.

Ogle was elected as a Democratic-Republican to the Fifteenth Congress.  He was not a candidate for renomination in 1818.  He served again as a member of the Pennsylvania House of Representatives from 1819 to 1823, and served as a member of the Pennsylvania State Senate for the 22nd district in 1827 and 1828.  He died in Somerset in 1832 and was interred in Union Cemetery.

Footnotes

Sources

The Political Graveyard

|-

|-

1766 births
1832 deaths
Politicians from Frederick, Maryland
American people of English descent
Democratic-Republican Party members of the United States House of Representatives from Pennsylvania
Members of the Pennsylvania House of Representatives
Pennsylvania state senators
Pennsylvania prothonotaries
American slave owners
People from Somerset, Pennsylvania
Pennsylvania National Guard personnel
American militia officers
American militiamen in the War of 1812
Burials in Pennsylvania